A list of films produced by the Tollywood (Bengali language film industry) based in Kolkata in the year 1987.

A-Z of films

References

External links
 Tollywood films of 1987 at the Internet Movie Database

1987
Lists of 1987 films by country or language
Films, Bengali